A Dark Winter is a 1998 fantasy novel by Dave Luckett. It follows the story of Willan "Will" de Parkin who along with Silvus and Sister Winterridge have set out to defeat the Dark armies and save the castle of Ys.

Background
A Dark Winter was first published in Australia in 1998 by Omnibus Books in paperback format. It won the 1998 Aurealis Award for best fantasy novel and was also a short-list nominee for the 1998 Aurealis Award for best young-adult novel but lost to Alison Goodman's Singing the Dogstar Blues.

References

External links

1998 Australian novels
Australian fantasy novels
Aurealis Award-winning works
Omnibus Books books